The ATG Javelin was an American small high-speed personal jet that was developed by the Aviation Technology Group (ATG) prior to its bankruptcy. Planned for FAA certification under 14 CFR part 23, the Javelin had a design resembling a fighter aircraft, an unusual concept for civilian jets. The Javelin MK-20 derivative, developed in cooperation between ATG and Israel Aerospace Industries, was expected to fill the jet trainer role for various air forces. The first prototype took flight on 30 September 2005, flown by retired Air Force 2nd Lt and test pilot Robert Fuschino.

ATG halted all further development on the Javelin in December 2007 after failing to get $200 million to finance further development.  The company subsequently declared bankruptcy in 2008, ending the development of the Javelin.

Javelin design rights were bought by Rud Aero, a very small airplane manufacturer.  They had partnered with another very small firm, Stavatti Aerospace to offer a variant of the Javelin for the U.S. Air Force's T-X program. This proved unsuccessful, with the Boeing-Saab T-7 Red Hawk being selected by the US Air Force on 27 September 2018.

Specifications (Javelin MK-10)

See also

References

External links

 Israel Aircraft Industries
 ACTA
 Airframer.com: ATG Javelin program suppliers
 Airframer.com: ATG Press Release, March 4, 2008

2000s United States civil utility aircraft
Very light jets
Cancelled aircraft projects
Twinjets
Javelin
Low-wing aircraft
Aircraft first flown in 2005
Projects established in 2005
Projects disestablished in 2007